Eucalyptus canobolensis, commonly known as the Mount Canobolas candlebark or silver-leaf candlebark, is a species of tree that is endemic to a small area of New South Wales in eastern Australia. It is a small tree with smooth bark on the trunk and branches, dull, lance-shaped adult leaves, flowers buds in groups of three, white flowers and cup-shaped, bell-shaped or conical fruit. It is only known from Mount Canobolas near Orange.

Description
It has smooth, often powdery, white, cream-coloured, yellowish or pink bark, sometimes with rough greyish bark at the base. They are more or less the same colour on both surfaces. Flowering has been observed in February and the flowers are white. The valves of the fruit extend beyond the rim.

Taxonomy and naming
Mount Canobolas candlebark was first described in 1991 by Lawrie Johnson and Ken Hill who gave it the name Eucalyptus rubida subsp. canobolensis from a specimen collected on Mount Canobolas, and published the description in the journal Telopea. In 1998 John Hunter raised it to species status as E. canobolensis. The specific epithet (canobolensis) refers to the type location. The ending -ensis is a Latin suffix meaning "place for" or "where".

Distribution and habitat
Eucalyptus canobolensis is only known from the upper slopes of Mount Canobolas where it grows in subalpine woodland.

Conservation status
Mount Canobolas candlebark is classified as "endangered" under the Australian Government Environment Protection and Biodiversity Conservation Act 1999 and as "vulnerable" under the New South Wales Government Biodiversity Conservation Act 2016. The main threats to the species are weed invasion, especially by blackberry (Rubus fruticosus) and Pinus radiata from nearby plantations, infrastructure development and forestry operations.

References

canobolensis
Myrtales of Australia
Flora of New South Wales
Trees of Australia
Plants described in 1991
Taxa named by Lawrence Alexander Sidney Johnson
Taxa named by Ken Hill (botanist)